The IBM ThinkPad TransNote is a notebook computer by IBM.

Features 
The TransNote consists of a leather-like folio case which contains a computer on one side and a paper notebook on the other side.

Specifications 
The TransNote comes equipped with: 

 10.4" TFT FlipTouch display (800x600 resolution)
 600MHz Intel Mobile Pentium III
 ATi Rage Mobility M 4MB
 10GB or 20GB HDD
 64MB PC-100 memory standard, 320 MB max
 CompactFlash dock
 CardBus slot (type 2)
 PC Card slot.
 Two audio controllers: 
 Intel AC'97 Audio with a CS4297A codec
 Crystal Semiconductor CS4281
 MiniPCI slot with one of the following:
 3Com 10/100 Ethernet Mini-PCI Adapter with 56K Modem
 Xircom 10/100 EtherJet Mini PCI Adapter with 56K Modem
 ThinkScribe digital notepad

The battery pack uses flat Samsung 103450 cells.

Reception 
Computerworld called it a "failed design" because it tried to blend a large 3M digitized pad with a tiny underpowered laptop in the same product. PCQuest viewed it as an attractive choice for people who travel a lot. TechRepublic called it one of the 25 "unique and bizarre breakthroughs" in laptop innovation.

Awards 
The TransNote won a Gold iF Product Design Award in 2002 in the product discipline. The TransNote was the winner in the PC category of the PC Magazine Awards for Technical Excellence in 2001.

Further developments 
IBM announced the discontinuation of the TransNote in February 2002, intending to discontinue it at the end of the year.

References

External links 

 Transnote.info on the Internet Archive
 Laptop.pics
 Japanese TransNote brochure
 IBM Hardware Maintenance Manual 

IBM laptops
ThinkPad